The Huawei G6600 Passport is a mobile phone released in 2010.

References

Huawei mobile phones
Mobile phones introduced in 2010